Jake Vedder (born April 16, 1998) is an American snowboarder who competes internationally in the snowboard cross discipline. He represented the United States at the 2022 Winter Olympics.

Career
Vedder represented the United States at the 2016 Winter Youth Olympics where he won a gold medal in the snowboard cross event. He also competed at the 2019 FIS Snowboarding Junior World Championships and won a silver medal.

He represented the United States at the 2022 Winter Olympics as an alternate in the snowboard cross event, replacing an injured Alex Deibold, finishing in sixth place.

References

External links

1998 births
Living people
American male snowboarders
Olympic snowboarders of the United States
People from Pinckney, Michigan
Snowboarders at the 2022 Winter Olympics
Snowboarders at the 2016 Winter Youth Olympics
20th-century American people
21st-century American people